The 2004 United States presidential election in Texas took place on November 2, 2004, and was part of the 2004 United States presidential election. State voters chose 34 representatives, or electors to the Electoral College, who voted for president and vice president.

Texas was won by incumbent Republican President George W. Bush by a margin of 22.87%. Prior to the election, all 12 major U.S. news organizations expected Texas to vote for Bush, considering it to be a safe red state.

Texas has not voted for a Democratic presidential nominee since 1976, and has been a Republican stronghold since the 1980s. A former governor of the state, Bush’s performance stands as a high water mark for Republican presidential candidates in Texas, and remains the last time that a Republican has won more than 60% of the state’s vote, or that a Democrat has won less than 40%. Bush is the last Republican to win any of the following counties in a presidential election: Bexar, Cameron, Culberson, Dallas, and Harris. The 1,067,968 ballots cast in Harris County also marked the first time that any Texas county would cast more than one million votes.  However, this is also the last election where Harris County would vote to the left of any of the top 5 most populous counties in the state, with the exception of Tarrant County.  Harris County in this election voted to the left of Bexar by approximately only 0.2% of the votes.  This is also the last election where the Republican candidate would win Tarrant County with at least 60% of the vote.  Starting from 2008, Republicans would win Tarrant county with less than 60% of the vote, and in 2020 Joe Biden would eventually win Tarrant County.  

Bush, who made historic gains with Latino voters in 2004, drew even with Kerry among Texas Latinos, winning 49% to Kerry's 50%. As of 2020, this election is the closest a Republican has come to carrying the Latino vote in Texas.

This is the last presidential election in which Texas voted to the right of West Virginia, Kentucky, Tennessee, Arkansas, or Louisiana. This is also the only time since 1984 in which a Republican candidate has gotten over 60% of the vote due to the increasing Democratic shift in many of the urban counties Bush carried in this election. All of these counties would swing hard towards Barack Obama in 2008.

Primaries
 2004 Texas Democratic presidential primary
 2004 Texas Republican presidential primary

Campaign

Predictions
There were 12 news organizations who made state-by-state predictions of the election. Here are their last predictions before election day.

 D.C. Political Report: Solid Republican
 Associated Press: Solid Bush
 CNN: Bush
Cook Political Report: Solid Republican
 Newsweek: Solid Bush
New York Times: Solid Bush
 Rasmussen Reports: Bush
 Research 2000: Solid Bush
Washington Post: Bush
Washington Times: Solid Bush
Zogby International: Bush
 Washington Dispatch: Bush

Polling
Bush won every single pre-election poll, and won each with at least 55% of the vote and a double-digit margin of victory. The final three polls averaged Bush leading 59% to 37%.

Fundraising
Bush raised $23,776,943. Kerry raised $5,554,831.

Advertising and visits
Neither campaign advertised or visited this state during the fall election.

Analysis

Texas, located in the South, has become a consistently Republican state at all levels. Economically and racially diverse, Texas includes a huge swath of the Bible Belt where many voters, especially those in rural Texas, identify as born-again or evangelical Christians and therefore tend to vote Republican due to the party's opposition to abortion. Although once part of the Solid South, the last time Texas voted for a Democratic presidential nominee was Jimmy Carter in 1976.  George Bush achieved his party's best result in Texas since Ronald Reagan's second landslide in 1984.

President Bush carried 236 of the state's 254 counties, improving on his performance from 2000. East Texas, historically the most Democratic region in the state, solidified its support for the Republican Party with only Jefferson County, home to Beaumont, voting for John Kerry. South Texas, while still voting heavily for Senator Kerry, swung towards Bush as well.

Despite Bush's increased margin in the state compared to 2000, Kerry made major inroads in the state's suburban areas, especially in Metro Houston, the Dallas Fort Worth Metroplex, and the Austin area. Kerry narrowed Bush's 2000 margins in Collin, Dallas, Denton, Fort Bend, Harris, Hays, Travis, and Williamson Counties. Out of those, however, only Travis County, home to Austin, flipped into the Democratic column, in part due to the city's strong liberal leanings and opposition to the Iraq War. Bush had won a plurality in the county in 2000 in part due to the Green Party's Ralph Nader winning 11% of the County's vote. Although Bush carried Dallas County by a narrow margin of 50% to Kerry's 49%, the city of Dallas proper voted heavily for Kerry, giving him 57% of the vote.

Results

By county

Counties that flipped from Democratic to Republican
Cameron (Largest city: Brownsville)
Culberson (Largest city: Van Horn)
Frio (Largest city: Pearsall)
Morris (Largest city: Daingerfield)
Newton (Largest city: Newton)
Reeves (Largest city: Pecos)
Robertson (Largest city: Hearne)

Counties that flipped from Republican to Democratic
Travis (Largest city: Austin)

By congressional district
Bush won 25 of 32 congressional districts, including four held by Democrats.

Electors

Technically the voters of Texas cast their ballots for electors: representatives to the Electoral College. Texas is allocated 34 electors because it has 32 congressional districts and 2 senators. All candidates who appear on the ballot or qualify to receive write-in votes must submit a list of 34 electors, who pledge to vote for their candidate and his or her running mate. Whoever wins the majority of votes in the state is awarded all 34 electoral votes. Their chosen electors then vote for president and vice president. Although electors are pledged to their candidate and running mate, they are not obligated to vote for them. An elector who votes for someone other than his or her candidate is known as a faithless elector.

The electors of each state and the District of Columbia met on December 13, 2004, to cast their votes for president and vice president. The Electoral College itself never meets as one body. Instead the electors from each state and the District of Columbia met in their respective capitols.

The following were the members of the Electoral College from the state. All 34 were pledged to Bush/Cheney:

 Royce Hayes
 Tom Cotter
 Jay Pierce
 Marjorie Chandler
 Lance Lenz
 Barbara Grusendorf
 Bill Borden
 Jim Wiggins
 Anna Rice
 Jan Galbraith
 Sue Brannon
 Cheryl Surber
 Mike Ussery
 Sid Young
 Frank Morris
 Roger O'Dell
 Christopher DeCluitt
 Martha Greenlaw
 Marcus Anderson
 Mike Provost
 Bennie Bock
 Kathy Haigler
 Kim Hesley
 Peter Wrench
 Morris Woods
 Rhealyn Samuelson
 Nancy Stevens
 Loyce McCarter
 Larry Bowles
 Dan Mosher
 Glenn Warren
 Kristina Kiik
 Susan Weddington
 Charles Burchett

See also
 United States presidential elections in Texas
 Presidency of George W. Bush

References

Texas
2004
United States presidential